Deception Bay State High School is a co-educational, state run high school located in Deception Bay, Queensland, Australia. The School services the Deception Bay area's high school students- years 7 to 12.

The school first opened its doors to students in 1992.

Today, there are approximately 1000 students enrolled in the school. The school principal is Kyrra Mickelborough. The school motto is "Empowering Learners to Thrive". The school has four sport houses houses, Cawley, Bradman, Elliott and Gould. The school also has a volleyball development program for those who have talent and are interested in the sport. The school offers a range of curriculum in the senior school that caters for different pathways. It is renowned for its strong focus on VET certificates, especially Hospitality, Early Childhood, Horticulture and Fitness.

Recognition
From 2016, the school has increased its enrolments by 15%; achieved 100% QCE attainment; reduced its school disciplinary absences by 40%; improved A-C student outcomes to be the highest in the North Coast Region. It is renowned for its flexible programs- Futures (for seniors) and Aspire (for young mums) and its focus on Positive Behaviour for Learning and Restorative Practices to improve the learning culture of the school.

Uniform
The uniform is based on three colours: maroon, white and black.  The unisex general uniform consists of a polo shirt, with the school logo and black nylon shorts with a maroon feature on one leg. Students also wear a formal uniform on Mondays and special occasions. For girls, this consists of a white blouse, with either maroon skirt or black shorts. The boy's formal uniform consists of white buttoned shirt, with black shorts. Students are able to wear black uniform tracksuit pants with their general uniform only. There is a choice of two jackets for colder weather.

==See also==
List of schools in Queensland

External links
 Deception Bay State High School website

Public high schools in Queensland
Educational institutions established in 1992
Schools in South East Queensland
Buildings and structures in Moreton Bay Region
1992 establishments in Australia